Mohamed Rahim is a Moroccan professional footballer who plays as a defender. The player had played 2020 Semi Final Champions League where he was loaned to Wydad AC for 3 months . In the beginning of 2021 season Rahim came back to his home team for 4 years contract

References

1995 births
Living people
Moroccan footballers
Association football defenders